Zorko is both a surname and a given name.

Surname:
Branko Zorko (born 1967), Croatian middle-distance runner
Dayne Zorko (born 1989), Australian rules footballer
Janez Zorko (born 1937), Slovenian sculptor and mountain climber
Vlasta Zorko (born 1934), Slovenian sculptor
Zdenko Zorko (born 1950), Croatian handball player
Zinka Zorko (1936–2019), Slovenian linguist and academic

Given name:
Zorko Cvetković
Zorko Čanadi
Zorko Prelovec (1887–1939), Slovenian composer

Croatian masculine given names
Slovene masculine given names
Croatian surnames
Slovene-language surnames